Graphisurus is a genus of beetles in the family Cerambycidae, containing the following species:

 Graphisurus despectus (LeConte in Agassiz, 1850)
 Graphisurus eucharis (Bates, 1885)
 Graphisurus fasciatus (Degeer, 1775)
 Graphisurus triangulifer (Haldeman, 1847)
 Graphisurus vexillaris (Bates, 1872)

References

Acanthocinini